This is a list of episodes for the 1950s British television series The Adventures of Robin Hood, sometimes broadcast in North America under the title The Adventures in Sherwood Forest. This show ran for 143 episodes across four series.

Home media

VHS releases
ITC Home Video (UK) released three double tape editions of the series:
 "The Beginning" (14 October 1991) containing "The Coming of Robin Hood", "The Moneylender", "Dead or Alive", "Friar Tuck", "Maid Marian", "A Guest For The Gallows". 152 mins.
 "The Challenge" (10 February 1992) containing "The Knight Who Came to Dinner", "Queen Eleanor", "Checkmate", "The Ordeal", "The Inquisitor", "The Challenge". 152 mins (ITC 8101).
 "The Thieves Den" (22 June 1992) containing "Pepper", "A Tuck in Time", "The Charter", "The Salt King". 100 mins (ITC 8102)

Network Video (UK) released videotape PAL versions beginning in 2003.

Marathon Music and Video (US) released 21 VHS tapes of the series in 2000 (two episodes per tape in a random order).

DVD releases
The Adventures of Robin Hood has been released by many companies, as under British law TV transmissions are only protected by broadcast copyright for a period of 50 years (due to the Copyright Act of 1956), hence all the episodes had ceased to be in copyright by 2009 so far as the broadcaster is concerned. Scriptwriters, composers, musicians and actors retain copyright in their respective contributions to each episode for a much longer period, but such rights generally are not enforceable by the broadcaster, hence their enforcement tends to be non-existent in practice.

In Universal Region ALL NTSC format, Mill Creek Entertainment released all four seasons on DVD between 18 March 2008 and 25 August 2009, and eventually released a complete series set on 25 August 2009 – 143 episodes on 11 discs. The films have been mainly sourced from poor quality American prints, though some are from better quality European sources. Some episodes feature the "Adventures in Sherwood Forest" opening titles and a few are CBS syndicated prints. In addition, three episodes: "Farewell To Tuck", "The Charm Pedlar", "The Parting Guest" have no on-screen titles at all.

In Region 0 NTSC format, Alpha Video in the USA released twenty-two DVDs of various episodes from the series, each disc containing four episodes (88 episodes in total).

In Region 0 format, series 1 & 4, and in Region 2, series 2 & 3 in PAL format, Network released the complete series in the UK in four boxed sets of DVDs, licensed from the official copyright holder Granada Ventures. The first three series have 39 episodes each and are on five-disc sets, while the last series has 26 episodes and is on three discs. The films have been taken from original Archive prints and are of variable quality. Three episodes feature French opening and end title sequences and no on-screen titles: "Farewell To Tuck", "The Charm Pedlar", "The Parting Guest". One episode, "The Minstrel", has French opening titles but original English end titles and retains the episode title.

In NTSC format, the first series has been released by Edi video (2005), TMG (Timeless Media Group) as a three DVD boxed set (2005) and by Pop Flix as a 4-disc collection (2010). Other US companies such as Genius Entertainment, Critics Choice, Nostalgia Ventures, East West Entertainment, Digiview Productions, PC Treasures Inc, Echo Bridge Entertainment, and PR studios have released limited runs on DVD.

In Region 2 in PAL format, KNM Home Entertainment has released, in Germany, three DVD sets containing the 26 episodes (a mix of series 1 and 2 episodes) that were dubbed into German and transmitted by ARD between 1971 and 1974.

A complete series 18-disc box set was released by Network DVD in December 2011 in Region 2.

{| class=wikitable style="text-align:center"
! colspan=2 rowspan=2|Series
! rowspan=2|No. of episodes
! colspan=2|Originally aired:! colspan=3|DVD releases
|-
! Premiered
! Ended! colspan=1|
! colspan=2|Universal Region ALL / NTSC
|-
| style="width:5px; background:#BFF0FF"|
! 1
| 39
| 25 September 1955
| 23 June 1956| 30 June 20033 March 2008 [Network DVD (UK)]
| rowspan=4| Complete Series  [Mill Creek Entertainment (US)]
| 18 March 2008 [Mill Creek (US)]
|-
| bgcolor="F3CE4E"|
! 2
| 37
| 10 August 1956
| 9 June 1957| 30 June 2003, 26 April 2004, 1 December 2008 [Network DVD (UK)]
| 14 October 2008[Mill Creek (US)]
|-
| bgcolor="195905"|
! 3
| 41
| 6 September 1957
| 22 June 1958|align="center" width="150px"| 18 October 20041 November 2008 [Network DVD (UK)]
|align="center" width="150px"| 31 March 2009[Mill Creek (US)]
|-
| bgcolor="AC1F1F"|
! 4
| 26
| 14 September 1958
| 1 March 1959| 24 January 2005[Network DVD (UK)]
| 25 August 2009[Mill Creek (US)]
|}

Episode list
 Nº = Overall episode number
 Ep = Episode number by series

This episode list shows the order and dates in which episodes were shown in the London region. Episodes were first shown on different dates and sometimes out of sequence in other regions, the US and in other countries.

Airdates are for ATV London  ITV regions varied date and order. The order is taken from the British Film Institute database. Except: "Errand of Mercy" (series 1) no BFI data, original US TX date used. "The Goldmaker" and "Isabella" (series 2) no BFI TX date for (1956/57) only (1961), original US TX dates used. "The Salt King" (series 3) 1st repeat BFI date used, as BFI 1st TX date places episode at start of series 2. IMDb gives broadcast dates and order shown in the US.

At the time this show was produced in the 1950s, British television production was organised on the basis of 13-week production blocks, with contracts being parcelled out by the broadcaster in quantities of thirteen episodes each—exactly one quarter of a 52-week year. Accordingly, all seasons of this show were made in some multiple of thirteen episodes, and the writers and guest stars featured were normally signed to contracts for 13 weeks at a time.

Screenwriters
Many writers on the show were Americans who had been blacklisted as communists in Hollywood, by the House Committee on Un-American Activities. These writers worked under pseudonyms, often changing them every few episodes to avoid drawing attention to themselves.

As well, pseudonyms were sometimes shared between writers, or traded from one writer to another. In particular, the names "John Dyson" and "Neil R. Collins" appear to have been house pseudonyms that were assigned to various writers at different times, with no special affiliation to any one writer or writing team.

 Ring Lardner, Jr. wrote the first episode under the name Lawrence McClellan. This was later changed to the name Eric Heath for UK broadcast.
 Ring Lardner, Jr. and Ian McLellan Hunter used a variety of pseudonyms when working individually or collaboratively. Lardner's notes credit the following pseudonyms to work done by Lardner and/or Hunter: Eric Heath, Oliver Skene, Samuel B. West, Ian Larkin, John Dyson, Leighton Reynolds, Paul Symonds, Neil R. Collins.
 Waldo Salt wrote episodes under the name Arthur Behr, John Dyson and Neil R. Collins.
 When Howard Koch wrote episodes with his wife Anne, they used the single pseudonym Anne Rodney.
 Adrian Scott wrote one episode as Leslie Poynton. The name Leslie Poynton was used on several episodes; it is unknown which other writers may have used this pseudonym.
 Robert Lees wrote several episodes, according to Lardner's papers, as John Dyson. It has been suggested that C. Douglas Phipps (credited writer of episode 30) is another Lees pseudonym, although this is not confirmed.

Series 1 (1955–56)

Series 2 (1956–57)

Series 3 (1957–58)

Series 4 (1958–59)

Having moved the game show Name That Tune from Tuesday nights to Monday nights at 7.30pm for the 1958 fall season, CBS screened the fourth series in the US on Saturday mornings at 11.30am. After several re-runs, which started on 4 October 1958, the final episodes were transmitted between 10 January and 26 September 1959.

References

External links
 
 List of 
 The Adventures of Robin Hood: A Robin Hood Spotlight
 Download episodes of The Adventures of Robin Hood at the Internet Archive

Adventures of Robin Hood
Adventures of Robin Hood
Adventures of Robin Hood

nl:The Adventures of Robin Hood (serie)